Tramitichromis variabilis is a species of cichlid endemic to Lake Malawi where it is found over sand/rock substrates at about  depth.  It can reach a length of  TL. It can also be found in the aquarium trade.

References

variabilis
Taxa named by Ethelwynn Trewavas
Fish described in 1931
Taxonomy articles created by Polbot